Flubber is a franchise that consists of American science-fiction-comedy films, with three theatrical releases, and two made-for-television films. The overall story is based on the short story, A Situation of Gravity, written by Samuel W. Taylor in 1922. The plot of the films center around an absent-minded college professor (with differing names and played by various actors depending on the adaptation), who works tirelessly to find the next great invention. The Professor wants to make scientific history, while working to save the school at which he works, the Medfield College.

The two original films, starring Fred MacMurray, were financially and critically well-received. Years later during the '80s, a made-for-television remake was released as a part of The Magical World of Disney series, with a sequel that followed soon thereafter. By 1997, a theatrical remake, with the story adjusted for then-modern time, was developed with Robin Williams in the starring role.

Though each film was a financial success, not all were critical successes. Critics called the remake "a total dud", while others noted that the studio's attempt at relaunching the franchise resulted in "a cute, well-meaning, but ultimately disappointing movie". Several critics noted the film's overuse of slapstick comedy. In 1999 the Flubber films, along with a number of other Disney film series, were expanded as a franchise into the Walt Disney Parks attraction with elements included from each movie.

Films

Theatrical

The Absent-Minded Professor (1961) 

Professor Ned Brainard works endlessly in his lab, looking for the next greatest invention. His fiancé Betsy grows tired of being put second behind his experiments. Brainard forgets about their own wedding for the third time. However, he finds a scientific anomaly when he invents a revolutionary flying rubber, which he names Flubber. This substance proves to have various abilities. While he works to reconnect with Betsy, criminals led by Alonzo Hawk seek to steal his formula.

Son of Flubber (1963)  

Professor Ned Brainard, who experienced a series of misfortunes up until his invention of the super-elastic substance called Flubber, works to find the next scientific discovery. He hopes to have a better experience with a gravity-defying derivative he names, Flubbergas. When the government steps in to obstruct his work, his wife Betsy expresses her concern and displeasure with his experiments stating that they need a divorce. After a some alterations to his substance Brainard works to find the solution of his new invention, win back the confidence of his wife, resolve the government's concerns, and defeat the familiar nefarious acts of Alonzo Hawk.

Flubber (1997) 

A loose remake of The Absent-Minded Professor, the plot follows a similar outline.

Professor Philip Brainard experiments to find new sources of energy, believing that the project can strengthen the finances of Medfield College. His girlfriend SaraJean works as President of the college and tries to support his tireless work in his laboratory. When his work uncovers a lively, super-stretchy, rubber-like substance that he names Flubber, the professor is so excited he absent-mindedly forgets his own wedding. SaraJean dumps him for his apparent lack of prioritization, so Brainard sets to work in winning her back. In the meantime, he discovers that Flubber has a mind of its own, and has a mischievous nature. All the while, some villainous people seek to steal the newly discovered substance for their own gain.

Television

Disney's The Absent Minded Professor (1988) 

Professor Henry Crawford, an absent-minded instructor at a college busily works in laboratory on various experiments. His girlfriend Ellie, grows frustrated when he repeatedly misses their dates and spends more time in his science lab than with her. One day Crawford makes an unprecedented discovery, in the form of rubber that defies gravity. The professor names the substance Flubber and hopes that he can prove he is a notable scientist, while also showing his love to his girlfriend.

Disney's The Absent-Minded Professor: Trading Places (1989) 

Professor Henry Crawford is convinced by an ex-roommate and former college named. Jack Brooker to switch professions. For the trade, Henry will go to work at the elusive Rhinebloom Labs and Jack will teach Henry's students. What Henry doesn't know is that Jack suspects that the lab may be involved in some illegal activity. When Henry tries investigate the situation through a computer, Albert a virus named Albert is inadvertently released. Together, the colleges discover that the program is a weapons system. Together, and with the help of Flubber, they work to stop the destructive software.

Related films

The Medfield College appears in the Flubber franchise as a primary location of plot events. The fictional college appears in two other Disney film franchises, including The Shaggy Dog, and the Dexter Riley film series, while Alonzo Hawk, the villain of the original Flubber films, appears in the second Herbie film, Herbie Rides Again. Collectively, the four separate film series take place within the same fictional universe. Additionally, the Merlin Jones film series take place at the in-universe sister-school, Midvale College; meanwhile, The World's Greatest Athlete is set at the related academic school of Merrivale College.

Principal cast and characters

Additional crew and production details

Reception

Box office and financial performance

Critical and public response

Themepark attraction

In 1999, the theme of Journey into Imagination was changed and re-titled to include Figment. The ride features Dr. Nigel Channing, from Honey, I Shrunk the Audience!, who "hosts" an area known as the Imagination Institute. The story states that Channing's grandfather established the institute, while the area features references to Dr. Philip Brainard from Flubber, as well as Wayne Szalinski from the Honey, I Shrunk the Kids franchise and Dean Higgins (Joe Flynn's role in the Dexter Riley films). Walt Disney and Thomas Edison also make an appearance.

Notes

References 

American science fiction comedy films
Disney film series